Ang Himig Natin (English: Our Hymn) is a song by Filipino Rock band Juan de la Cruz composed by Pepe Smith and was credited to mark the beginning of Pinoy rock music in the Philippines. The song was released  and  included in Juan de la Cruz's groundbreaking album Himig Natin in 1973 and was said to be the start of the origin of the term Pinoy Rock.

References

Pinoy rock
OPM (band) songs